Ness Wadia College of Commerce is a college affiliated with the Savitribai Phule Pune University, run by the Modern Education Society. This college was founded by Indian businessman Sir Ness Wadia.

Early history
It has been well represented on University Boards of Studies where its faculty members have been providing valuable inputs to the Board
members. Within the institution, teachers are working on drafting syllabi for its own autonomous courses. The heads of departments meet to ensure that the syllabus is fully covered.

Background
The background of the Ness Wadia College of Commerce can be traced back to June 1959 when the first pre-degree commerce class was started under the auspices of the Modern Education Society. The class was held in the Nowrosjee Wadia College of Arts and Science. In the years that followed a need to establish a full-fledged commerce college was identified.
In 1969, the commerce wing came to be established as an independent college of commerce, named after the industrialist and philanthropist Sir Ness Wadia (1873-1952). His brother Sir Cusrow Wadia also contributed to the establishment of the college. The college moved into its present premises with a building of its own in 1971. The college was inaugurated on 15 July 1969, by Dr. H. V. Pataskar, the then vice-chancellor of the University of Pune.
It came to be headed by Dr. B. S. Bhanage, one of the leading scholars of his time who later became the vice-chancellor of Shivaji University. He was followed in 1972 by Professor V. K. Nulkar who retired in 1991. Professor Dr. H. M. Shaikh took over charge of the college from Principal Nulkar who remained principal until February 2000 when he retired. Dr. Ms. V. S. Devdhar took over as principal in Feb 2000 on Principal Shaikh's retirement. After her retirement in June 2009 Dr. H. V. Deosthali worked as acting principal until Dr. M. M. Andar took over on his retirement in January 2010.

Academics
The majors offered are as follows.

Senior College
Under Graduate Courses-
B.Com
BBA
BCA
BBM-IB

Post Graduation Courses-
M.Com
MCA

Post Graduation Diploma Courses-
DTL
DBF
DIB

Ph.D. Courses-
The college is a recognized Research Centre for Ph.D. by the University of Pune under its Faculty of Commerce.

Autonomous Courses
Certificate Course in Tally. ERP 9
Business English
ICICI Bank University E-Learning Course
ICICI Equity Investment Course
Certificate Course in Spoken English
Certificate Course in Business English
Certificate Course in Foreign Languages (French, German, Spanish, Chinese & Japanese)
ACCA, UK
CISI, UK

Campus & Infrastructure
The college has 2 seminar halls, 2 three-storeyed buildings, a library, gymnasium, a sports ground, bank, post office, stationery shop, BSNL Internet & telephone care centre, canteen, students' hostel and common rooms for boys and girls.

Library
The college has a spacious library spread over 526 Sq. metres with a seating capacity of approximately 200. It is open from 7.30 am to 5.30 pm on working days and is also open on holidays. It has a collection of over 50,000 books and subscribes to over 100 journals/periodicals. It subscribes to 4 e-journals along with N-List and participates in resource sharing with INFLIBNET. It has 18 computers for public access with internet bandwidth of speed 2 MBPS being provided. The library uses SOUL 2.0 Library

Gymkhana & Sports
Indoor and outdoor games and sports facilities are available in the college campus. An orientation programme is conducted every year to make the students aware of the sports facilities available to them. The college appoints expert coaches for various sports events. In the field of sports, the students of the college have participated in sports activities organized at the inter-collegiate, inter-zonal, inter-university, state and national levels. Students have won various prizes, medals, shields and the General Championships many times. Many of the Students had got honor of being selected in various tournaments held in different parts of country at various levels. Since its establishment in 1969, the college has maintained an outstanding sports record. Recently the college ground has been renovated with ultra-modern equipments. All kinds of facilities are provided for the students – a state of the art gymnasium, and well-equipped grounds for many sports.

Computer Laboratory
The institution has an up-to-date computer facility for teaching, administration and library. There are 2 Computer Laboratories – Computer lab I consisting of 20 branded Compaq Pcs and Computer lab II consisting of 30 computers which are branded Pcs (Lenovo Think centre Desktops) and an IBM Server X3400M3. Each laboratory has a battery backup of 4 hours and both laboratories have LAN facility. Only Licensed software is provided in the computer laboratories.

WiFi & Internet Facility
The WiFi facility ints and 2 Ruckus zone directors. 75 nodes are connected to this WiFi and 45 nodes are connected to BSNL Internet. This Internet facility is available free to all faculty on campus and to students on the campus on a nominal payment basis. The computers in the administration office have LAN connectivity within the offices of the principal and vice principal. The computers in the computer library and college library are LAN connected. All the computers in the college premises possess the licensed software.

Hostel
The college has three blocks of boys and girls hostels. Hostels are equipped with all modern amenities conveniences and comforts. The rooms are well ventilated and are suitably furnished. A new hostel is constructed with independent facility block containing separate mess and reading halls for boys and girls. The students staying in the hostel are provided subsidized mess facility. The hostel also provides guest room for parents/ relatives in case of emergency. Round the clock security is provided to both hostels and it is under CCTV surveillance.

Open air theater
The open air theater is a platform provided by the college to students who wish to explore their talents in extracurricular activities like dance, drama, poetry and other fields. This will help them to prepare for various competitions at intercollegiate level.

Placement and career guidance cell
The placement & career guidance cell of the college takes requests from prominent firms in Pune and Mumbai to hold seminars, workshops and presentations for recruitment into their varied cadres of employment. It organizes a career fest at the end of the year which absorbs substantial number of final year Ness Wadians in assorted industries. The college promises 100% placement assistance to every student, including the students of the B.Com., BBA, BBM (IB), BCA courses and postgraduate and diploma students who have opted for a career in industry.
The college placement cell covers job opportunities in the field of banking, marketing, finance, IT, insurance, etc. Companies like Infosys, Deloite, E-clerx, Metro, ADP, etc. are invited to select candidates. The placement cell also arranges for training in-
Group discussions
Interview techniques
Resume writing
Public speaking

Awards and rankings
The peer team of the National Council for Assessment and Accreditation (NAAC), Bangalore visited the college in February 2004 and accredited it with an A grade. This makes the college one of the two exclusive commerce colleges in Pune with an A grade. India Today has already ranked it as one of the top five colleges in the city.

Best college award & best principal award:
The college was selected two years consecutively for two University of Pune awards: the 'Best College Award (2005–06)' & the 'Best Principal Award (2006–07)'. Both the awards were presented by the Vice Chancellor on the University Foundation Day (10 February 2005).

Alumni
The college networks and collaborates with its past students through the Ex-Ness Wadians’ Association which is its alumni association. The former faculty is invited to the annual Foundation Day and other prominent occasions.

References

External links
 Official website
 Sister Institutions
 Ness Wadia College

Universities and colleges in Pune
Commerce colleges in India
1969 establishments in Maharashtra